John 1:11 is the eleventh verse in the first chapter of the Gospel of John in the New Testament of the Christian Bible.

Content
In the original Greek according to Westcott-Hort, this verse is:
Εἰς τὰ ἴδια ἦλθε, καὶ οἱ ἴδιοι αὐτὸν οὐ παρέλαβον.  

In the King James Version of the Bible the text reads:
He came unto his own, and his own received him not.

The New International Version translates the passage as:
He came to that which was his own, but his own did not receive him.

Analysis
Many believe "His own" refers principally to the Jewish people. Jesus came to them as if to his family, but they did not accept him. However it may be extended to the Gentiles, "who for a long time groaned in darkness, and seemed to wait for the light of justice," but also did not accept him. But the latter part of the verse seems to imply a few, of both Jews and Gentiles, embraced the faith.

Commentary from the Church Fathers
Chrysostom: "When He said that the world knew Him not, he referred to the times of the old dispensation, but what follows has reference to the time of his preaching; He came unto his own."

Augustine: "Because all things were made by Him."

Theophylact of Ohrid: " By his own, understand either the world, or Judæa, which He had chosen for His inheritance."

Chrysostom: "He came then unto His own, not for His own good, but for the good of others. But whence did He Who fills all things, and is every where present, come? He came out of condescension to us, though in reality He had been in the world all along. But the world not seeing Him, because it knew Him not, He designed to put on flesh. And this manifestation and condescension is called His advent. But the merciful God so contrives His dispensations, that we may shine forth in proportion to our goodness, and therefore He will not compel, but invites men, by persuasion and kindness, to come of their own accord: and so, when He came, some received Him, and others received Him not. He desires not an unwilling and forced service; for no one who comes unwillingly devotes himself wholly to Him. Whence what follows, And his own received him not. . He here calls the Jews His own, as being his peculiar people; as indeed are all men in some sense, being made by Him. And as above, to the shame of our common nature, he said, that the world which was made by Him, knew not its Maker: so here again, indignant at the ingratitude of the Jews, he brings a heavier charge, viz. that His own received Him not."

References

External links
Other translations of John 1:11 at BibleHub

01:11